Hyphessobrycon amaronensis is a species of fish in the family charicidae. It is native to South America.

Description
Hyphessobrycon amaronensis a small fish at about two to three centimeters. Its overall body color is a creamy yellow, along with a long brown stripe down its body.

Distribution and habitat
Hyphessobrycon amaronensis lives along the equator in the South American country of Colombia. It inhabits mirky waters accompanied with organic detritus. Its diet consists of algae.

Sources
http://www.humboldt.org.co/en/servicios-2/collections/catalog-of-specimens-types
http://www.fishbase.org/summary/65534#

Taxa named by Carlos A. García-Alzate, 
Taxa named by Cesar Román-Valencia
Fish described in 2010